FontLab is a font editor developed by Fontlab Ltd., Inc. Since the early 2000s, it has been the dominant software tool for commercial/retail digital font development. FontLab is available for Windows and macOS.

History
The software was initially developed by the company SoftUnion Ltd. of Saint Petersburg, Russia, under lead programmer Yuri Yarmola. In 1992, Pyrus North America Ltd. was formed in the United States to distribute and market FontLab 2.0 for Microsoft Windows, which was released in 1993. Pyrus North America eventually bought all the rights to FontLab, hired Yarmola, then restructured as Fontlab Ltd., Inc. The company is distributed, but programming is still done primarily by a Russian team, partly in St. Petersburg, while the company is incorporated in Panama.

FontLab's first Mac OS product was FontLab 3 for Mac, in 1998. Since then, FontLab (FontLab Studio for version 5) has been issued for both Mac and Windows. Although initially Windows versions always came first, with FontLab VI, the two versions have become in sync, with simultaneous releases. In addition, FontLab has developed spinoff font editors for specific markets. TypeTool, a simplified version of FontLab Studio, is quite inexpensive and serves as an entry level typeface editor, which is popular with students, hobbyists, and those whose typographic needs are relatively simple. In the past, AsiaFont Studio (or Fontlab Composer) was a more sophisticated version of Fontlab, with special features for editing Chinese, Japanese and Korean fonts. These functions are now included in Fontlab Studio since version 5.1. OpenType features for complex scripts like Arabic, Devanagari, and Thai are not directly supported, but can be added through Microsoft’s Volt.

At a time when fonts came in different formats and were platform-specific, FontLab also began to create a line of font creation and conversion utilities. ScanFont, a tool for converting scans and bitmaps of glyphs into vector glyphs was part of FontLab 2, but in the next version it was split off, and became a stand-alone application. With FontLab VI, the ScanFont functionality was again integrated into the main application.

Next came TransType, a font converter for moving fonts between TrueType, OpenType and Type 1 formats and between Macintosh and Windows platforms. A few shorter-lived and more specialized font converters followed: FONmaker, for converting vector fonts into bitmaps; FontFlasher, for converting “normal” vector fonts into pixelated vector fonts for low-resolution display in Flash apps; and FogLamp, for converting native Fontographer files into modern formats. (Newer versions of FontLab Studio, FontLab VI, and FontLab 7 can now open recent Fontographer files directly.)

Fontographer by Altsys, a popular font development tool, ceased development after its acquisition by Macromedia. During Macromedia's acquisition by Adobe Systems in 2005, Macromedia sold Fontographer's rights and code to FontLab Ltd.

Products

 FontLab (was FontLab Studio for version 5) – font editor for professional type designers.
 Fontographer – font editor for graphic designers, artists, publishers
 TypeTool – font editor for students, hobbyists, users with minor editing needs
 TransType – font converter for Macintosh and Windows; OpenType, TrueType, web fonts, and PostScript Type 1
 FontLab Pad – typesetting tool that supports all nascent color font formats and OpenType features.
 BitFonter – bitmap font editor
 ScanFont  font autotracing tool

Release history

 FontLab 8: 26 June 2022 (Mac and Windows)
 FontLab 7: 30 November 2019 (Mac and Windows)
 FontLab VI: 8 December 2017 (Mac and Windows)
 TypeTool 3: 28 March 2007 (Mac and Windows)
 FontLab Studio 5: 12 December 2005 (Mac), Nov 2005 (Windows)
 FontLab 4: 3 December 2001 (Windows)
 FontLab 3: 1 June 1998 (Windows), 1 April 1999 (Mac)
 TypeTool: 8 August 1997 (Winindows)

Deprecated and discontinued products 
 AsiaFont Studio (formerly FontLab Composer) – font editor for professional typeface designers of CJK fonts, or other fonts with exceptionally large glyph counts. Its functions were rolled into FontLab Studio 5.1 and later.
 Photofont – a technology/format for creating bitmap fonts with color, texture and transparency and using them in page layout and website design 
 SigMaker – a simple utility for adding a single character to a TrueType font
 FONmaker – a font converter that makes bitmap fonts from TrueType fonts
 FontFlasher – a font converter that optimizes fonts for display at small sizes and low resolution
 FogLamp – a font converter that converts Fontographer .fog files into several different modern formats

See also
 Comparison of font editors

References

Further reading

External links

 
 FontLab 7 product page

Vector graphics editors
Font editors